Mia and Me is a German children's series created by Gerhard Hahn. In the United States, it aired on Nickelodeon's Nick Jr. channel from May 3, 2014, to December 25, 2016. The show mixes live action  with computer animation.

Mia and Me is entirely owned by the German company Made 4 Entertainment (m4e) as of 2016. Before the 2016 German buyout, the show was a GermanItalianCanadian co-production.

A feature film titled Mia and Me: The Hero of Centopia was produced by Made 4 Entertainment, Hahn & m4e Productions, Studio B Animation, Studio 100 Animation and Flying Bark Productions. It was released in Germany on May 26, 2022.

Premise

After the death of her parents, a 12-year-old girl named Mia Marconi is gifted a game that her father had made in life, taking the form of a large book called The Legend of Centopia. Inside is magical runic writing and a password, which when read backwards, allows Mia to travel to the magical world of Centopia. The land is filled with mythological creatures, including: winged elves, pans (goat-like creatures), unicorns and dragons. While in Centopia, Mia changes into a winged elven girl with the unique ability to talk to unicorns. She meets and befriends a cast of magical characters: a unicorn named Lyria (and, later, Lyria's winged son Onchao); Yuko, a girl warrior who is a little jealous of how much attention Mia receives from Prince Mo, and Phuddle, a comedic pan.

Season 1 
With the help of oracles from a magic book, Mia and her friends must find the pieces of the trumptus, a magic horn made by Phuddle. It has been captured, broken apart in twenty pieces, and scattered by the munculus as it is the only thing that can destroy evil beings. Mia also works to stop the evil Queen Panthea, General Gargona and her munculus army from capturing the unicorns. Panthea, concerned about her aging appearance to the point where she always wears a mask, needs the unicorns' horns for their rejuvenating powers. Every time a unicorn horn is destroyed, more of the island of Centopia dies. The only cure to this destruction is the powerful "golden unicorn" named Onchao, who can easily make the desert bloom again and restore horns of other unicorns. After Mia and her friends succeed in defeating their adversaries with a trumptus blast, only Gargona survives. They have reached the final pages of the book and Mia returns to her world, where it is nearing the end of the school year. Mia plans to revisit Centopia in a few months, after the summer break.

Season 2 
In the second season, Mia spends her summer holiday at her grandpa's farm. There, she meets a worker named Mario, who towards the end of the season learns about her ability to travel to Centopia. In Centopia, a hunter named Rixel sets his sights on catching Onchao. Later in the season, the bully Violetta discovers Mia's secret after finding a slice of her magical bracelet. Violetta travels to Centopia and takes on the identity of an elf named Varia. As Varia, Violetta becomes one of Mia's allies and begins to be shown in a more sympathetic light, as her connections with her father are disrupted by her mother.

Season 3 
In Centopia, Gargona is joined by a bug-like villain named Dax as they try to catch a unicorn horn to bring their master (Drakon) back. In the real world, a blind girl named Sara finds Mia's bracelet and travels to Centopia. She is so relieved that she can see in this world and she even has the power to see the invisible spy bugs who follow Dax. In the season finale, Dax and Gargona succeed in taking Onchao's horn. Mia and her friends arrive at the castle where Gargona and Dax are talking to Drakon about their prize. Yuko and Mo foil the villains' plot by breaking the horn into pieces. Kyara, Onchao's new sister, heals Onchao's horn. Dax leaves Centopia and Gargona stays on the island. Back in the real world, Sara makes the decision to go back to her old school instead of a new school in Milan.

Season 4 
Centopia is facing an existential threat: original parts of the primeval continent are approaching and Dystopia, home of Lord Drakon and his Dark Elves, has been set in motion as well! A race against time begins, as Mia and her friends start their quest of finding the rare ingredients for the antidote: the Potion of Unity.

Transformation 
When Mia transforms into an elf, she first says the password into the bracelet. Then a yellow glow swirls around her making her disappear. We then see her in a half-human half-elf form. In Season 1, Mia notices a glow on her hand that moves around herself transforming her into her elf with her wings growing after the glow is done transforming her back. When she is done transforming, she flaps her wings with her legs bending. While doing this she smiles. But later, her smile turns to a frown and disappears into the yellow fog while screaming. In Season 2, we see a huge yellow blob fully transforming her all at once. The wings then appear on her back a few seconds later. This also applies for season 3 as well. In Season 3, her half-human, half-elf form looks exactly like her human form. We then see the same transformation process in Season 2. However when Mia disappears into the yellow fog, she instead says "Whoa!"

Being an Elf 
When Mia first becomes an elf, she wonders what happened to her, and she is super joyful when she finds out she grew wings. Despite all that, she has trouble flying in Season 1, and ends up crashing when entering Centopia. She doesn’t start getting better at flying near the end of Season 1. Her landings in Seasons 2, 3, and 4 become a lot better since she’s gotten better at flying.

Cast

Live action characters

 Rosabell Laurenti Sellers as Mia (seasons 1–2)
 Margot Nuccetelli as Mia (seasons 3–4)
 Adrian Moore as Vincent (season 1)
 Saphia Stoney as Paula (season 1)
 Josephine Benini as Violetta di Nola (seasons 1–2)
 Ray Lovelock as Renzo (season 2)
 Luca Murphy as Mario (season 2)
 Gianna Paola Scaffidi as Franca (season 2)
 Anthony Souter as Silvio Frascati (season 2)
 Sara Ricci as Contessa di Nola (season 2)
 Fabio Corallini as Vittorio (season 2)
 Douglas Dean as the boss of the bank (season 2)
 Massimiliano Pazzaglia as Shop Owner (season 2)
 Rick Braco as The Judge Back (season 2)
 Lucia Luna Laurenti Sellers as Sara (season 3)
 Laura Ruocco as Luciana (season 3)
 Giuseppe Grandin as Mr Monti (season 3)
 Rocco Tommaso Cicarelli as Mr Balani (season 3)
 Tommaso Neri as Fabio (season 3)
 Alex James Ellison as Mattis (season 4)
 Claire Schuyfell as Carina (season 4)
 Phillip Battley as Pieter (season 4)
 Harry Piekema as Hektor (season 4)
 Lucas Tavernier as Lucas (season 4)

Animated characters

Episodes

Season 1 (2012)

Season 2 (2015)

Season 3 (2017–2018)

Season 4 (2022 - )

Film
 Mia and Me: The Hero of Centopia, a feature film.

Broadcast

Since the first few seasons were distributed by Rainbow, a studio co-owned by Viacom, Mia and Me is broadcast on Viacom's Nickelodeon channels in many territories. Nick Jr. in the United States premiered the series beginning on May 3, 2014 and ending on December 25, 2016. Up until mid-2021, the show was available to stream on NickJr.com. In the United Kingdom, the series aired on Nick Jr. (UK and Ireland) in January 2014. Nickelodeon began airing the series in the Philippines on July 1, 2013. The series aired in Singapore on MediaCorp Okto, in Indonesia on RCTI and in Australia on 10 Peach (formally Eleven). The series is available through Netflix in many countries, since September 2014. In 2017, the series aired on eToonz in South Africa. In Brazil, the first season of the series premiered on Gloob, on April 14, 2014, and the second season premiered on January 23, 2017. Since October 12, 2020, the series has been aired on TV Cultura.

References

External links

 
 Mia and Me: The Hero of Centopia at IMDb

2010s Canadian animated television series
Canadian children's animated adventure television series
Canadian children's animated fantasy television series
German children's animated adventure television series
German children's animated fantasy television series
Italian children's animated adventure television series
Italian children's animated fantasy television series
Canadian television series with live action and animation
Italian television series with live action and animation
Nick Jr. original programming
Animated television series about orphans
Television series by Rainbow S.r.l.
Canadian computer-animated television series
Italian computer-animated television series
English-language television shows